Ashtyn Davis (born October 10, 1996) is an American football safety for the New York Jets of the National Football League (NFL). He played college football at California, where he was also a hurdler, and was drafted by the Jets in the third round of the 2020 NFL Draft.

Early life and high school
Davis grew up in Santa Cruz, California and attended Santa Cruz High School. He played wide receiver at Santa Cruz and joined the school's track team at the recommendation of his quarterback in order to become a faster football player. Although he was lightly recruited as a football player, Davis began receiving interest from college track coaches late in his senior year after he put up a strong performance 110 metres hurdles in a county track meet despite having never competed in the event before.

College career
Davis originally joined California's track and field team as a walk-on and only joined the football team after a tryout in the spring of his freshman year. In the second half of his redshirt sophomore year, Davis worked his way up the depth chart to become the starting safety alongside Jaylinn Hawkins.

As a redshirt junior, Davis made 56 tackles with five passes broken up and four interceptions while also returning 24 kicks for 629 yards and a touchdown and was named first-team All-Pac-12 Conference by the Associated Press, Athlon Sports and Pro Football Focus and honorable mention by the conference's coaches.

Davis entered his senior year on the watchlist for the Paul Hornung Award and rated the third-best safety prospect in the 2020 NFL Draft by ESPN analyst Mel Kiper. Davis was named a finalist for the Burlsworth Trophy. In the season finale against UCLA, Davis tied his single-game high in tackles with 8, including the last tackle of the game as part of a goal-line stand. Davis had 55 tackles, two interceptions, four passes defended, two forced fumbles and a fumble recovery in his senior season. He finished his collegiate career with 166 tackles, seven interceptions, 12 passes defended, two forced fumbles and three fumbles recovered on defense while returning 70 kicks for 1,604 yards and a touchdown and two punts for 33 yards.

In track and field as a senior, Davis won the Pac-12 110 meter hurdle title and was named second-team All-American. Davis was also named an NCAA Indoor All-American in the 60 meter hurdles.

Professional career

Davis was selected by the New York Jets with the 68th overall selection in the 2020 NFL Draft. The Jets previously traded defensive lineman Leonard Williams to the New York Giants to obtain the pick.

In Week 11 against the Los Angeles Chargers, Davis led the team with 12 tackles and recovered a fumble forced by teammate Marcus Maye on wide receiver Keenan Allen at the goal line during the 34–28 loss. He was placed on injured reserve on December 12, 2020.

On September 1, 2021, Davis was placed on injured reserve. He was activated on October 2.

References

External links
California Golden Bears bio
New York Jets bio

Living people
California Golden Bears football players
Players of American football from California
Sportspeople from Santa Cruz, California
California Golden Bears men's track and field athletes
1996 births
American football safeties
New York Jets players
Santa Cruz High School alumni
Ed Block Courage Award recipients